Lieutenant-Colonel Gordon Graham Donaldson was a senior officer in the British Army who died as a result of illness contracted during the disastrous Walcheren Campaign in 1809.  He was commissioned in the 1st Foot Guards (the Grenadier Guards).  There is a memorial to him in the Guards Officers Memorial at the Royal Military Chapel, Wellington Barracks.

Family

His eldest daughter, Eliza-Ann, married William Wright Esq, of Eyston Hall, Sudbury, in 1827.

1809 deaths
Grenadier Guards officers
British Army personnel of the Napoleonic Wars
18th-century births
British military personnel killed in action in the Napoleonic Wars